Sagot may refer to:

Places
 20242 Sagot, a minor planet in the Solar System

People with the surname Sagot
 Clovis Sagot (1854–1913) French art dealer
 Émile Sagot (1805–1888), French illustrator
 Julien Sagot (aka "Sagot"), Canadian musician
 Marie-France Sagot, French computer scientist
 Montserrat Sagot, Costa Rican sociologist
 Robert Sagot, namesake of minor planet 20242 Sagot

See also

 Sagat (disambiguation)
 Saget, surname
 Sagit (disambiguation)